Paraivongius nigritarsis is a species of leaf beetle of Cameroon and the Democratic Republic of the Congo. It was first described by Édouard Lefèvre in 1891.

References

Eumolpinae
Beetles of the Democratic Republic of the Congo
Beetles described in 1891
Taxa named by Édouard Lefèvre
Insects of Cameroon